Mazayjan (also Romanized as Mazāyjān and Mazāyejān) is a village in Izadkhvast-e Sharqi Rural District, Izadkhvast District, Zarrin Dasht County, Fars Province, Iran. At the 2006 census, its population was 2,116, in 454 families.

References 

Populated places in Zarrin Dasht County